Mohamed Mahmoud AbdelAziz  commonly known as Mohamed AbdelAziz, is an Egyptian producer and actor. He  is also  the son of the famous actor Mahmoud Abdel Aziz.

Biography

Early life
Mohamed Mahmoud Abdel Aziz grew up in an artistic family, for his father being Mahmoud Abdel Aziz and his step-mother Poussy Shalabi, made Mohamed and his younger brother Karim, work in the same field.

Career
Mohamed graduated from the Egyptian Naval Academy in Alexandria with a major in marketing. He started his career by working in the field of advertising for some time, at the Established On Time Company for Advertising and Promotions company, and has produced a large number of important concerts inside and outside of Egypt for many renown singers in the Arab community.
Mohamed then worked as Assistant director in some movies, before having the opportunity to work on Egyptian blockbusters including The BabyDoll Night. 
Mohamed then turned to acting and landed supporting roles in TV shows like Shabab Ala El Hawa and El Kota El Amia as well as in some movies including Kazalek Fel Zamalek and Yahia El Adl.

Mohamed received the Readers Poll Award for Best young face in 2010 for his role in the movie Shabalo and the TV series El Kota El Amia.
Mohamed then established his own production company, CORE Production, which he used to make a joint venture with a second production company, SWITCH Adv, leading to the creation of the Egyptian Arts Group through which he then realized many of his successful productions.

Held Positions
Core Production representative in Egyptian Arts Group
Chairman of CORE Production Co.
ONTIME Founder

Assistant director

The BabyDoll Night

Actor

El Nems (2000)
Rehla Mashboha (2001)
Yahia El Adel (2001)
Shabab Ala El Hawa (2002)
Kazalek Fel Zamalek (2002)
El Kota El Amia (2010)

Production Work

About Egyptian Arts Group
Egyptian Arts Group is a Cairo-based Production Company serving the MENA region. Egyptian Arts Group is a joint venture established between Switch & Core Production; with a combined experience in all media production fields.

References

External links

1981 births
People from Cairo Governorate
Egyptian film producers
Living people
Egyptian male television actors